Southeast Asian music encapsulates numerous musical traditions and styles in many countries of Southeast Asia. This subregion consists of eleven countries, namely, Brunei, Cambodia, East Timor, Indonesia, Laos, Malaysia, Myanmar, Philippines, Singapore, Thailand and Vietnam, which accommodate hundreds of ethnic groups. Thousands of styles of music are present as a result of regional groups speaking many languages all over the subregion of Asia. Regionalism is usually accepted and celebrated, however, it is sometimes suppressed by the people, even though countries from southeast Asia are trying to construct national cultures. Hinduism, Buddhism, Islam, and Christianity are the paramount faiths in Southeast Asia. Throughout history to the present time, instrumental and vocal music has been centralized and focused on the religious life of subregional Asia. Urbanization has helped to assimilate musical and religious practices. Although modernization has put a significant threat on the distinctive regional music traditions, most countries in the region have maintained their own unique style and nature of music that encapsulates various periods of development in music, culture, and belief.

See also
Music of Brunei
Music of Cambodia
Music of East Timor
Music of Indonesia
Music of Bali
Music of Sunda
Music of Java
Music of Sumatra
Music of Laos
Music of Malaysia
Music of Myanmar
Music of the Philippines
P-pop
Filipino folk music
Filipino rock
Filipino hip hop
Filipino reggae
Music of Singapore
Music of Thailand
Music of Vietnam

References

External links
 The traditional music and instruments of Southeast Asia
 Malaysian Music Industry DirectoryCambodia,